The West Papuan Highland languages, also known as the Irian Highland languages, are a branch of the Trans–New Guinea language family proposed by Larson & Larson (1972) and confirmed by Timothy Usher. William A. Foley considers their Trans–New Guinea identity to be established.

 Dani (Balim Valley) family
 Paniai Lakes (Wissel Lakes) family 
 Amung–Dem
Amung (Uhunduni, Damal)
Dem

History
Capell linked the Dani languages to Kwerba in 1962, a position followed by Wurm, who included Dani-Kwerba and the Wissel Lakes (Paniai Lakes) languages as branches of Trans–New Guinea. Larson & Larson (1972) proposed that the Dani and Paniai Lakes families, along with the Amung and Dem isolates, grouped together within TNG. Ross (2005) suggests a possible link between Dani and Paniai with his West TNG proposal. Usher confirms Larson & Larson and finds that the Amung and Dem languages are closest to each other.

Lexical comparison
The lexical data below is from the Trans-New Guinea database and Usher (2020). The Bayono-Awbono data is from Wilbrink (2004). Neighboring languages not traditionally classified within West Papuan Highlands are also included for comparison.

References

 
Trans–New Guinea languages
Languages of western New Guinea